Garhwa railway station (station code: GHQ) is a railway station located in Garhwa district, Jharkhand. This is a railway station for Garhwa which is a headquarter of Garhwa district. It belongs to East Central Railway. All major express and passenger train stop here.

See also
 Garwa Road railway station
Garhwa Railway Station has 03 platforms and 05 lines

References

External links

Railway stations in Palamu district
Dhanbad railway division